Obisia “Golden Gloves” Nwankpa (born 19 May 1950 in Lagos) is a Nigerian professional light/light welterweight boxer of the 1970s, 1980s and 1990s who won Nigerian lightweight title, African Boxing Union light welterweight title, and Commonwealth lightweight title, and was a challenger for World Boxing Council (WBC) light welterweight title against Saoul Mamby, his professional fighting weight varied from , i.e. lightweight to , i.e. light welterweight.

He competed in the men's light welterweight event at the 1972 Summer Olympics. At the 1972 Summer Olympics, he lost in his first fight to Laudiel Negron of Puerto Rico.

At the 1973 All-Africa Games in Lagos, Nwankpa participated in the light-welterweight competition. He won the gold medal, defeating Issake Dabore of Niger in the final. He also won the gold medal in the light-welterweight category at the 1974 British Commonwealth Games, defeating Anthony Martey of Ghana in the final.

References

External links
 
 
 
 

Lightweight boxers
Light-welterweight boxers
African Boxing Union champions
Sportspeople from Lagos
Boxers at the 1974 British Commonwealth Games
Commonwealth Games gold medallists for Nigeria
1950 births
Living people
Nigerian male boxers
Commonwealth Games medallists in boxing
African Games gold medalists for Nigeria
African Games medalists in boxing
Boxers at the 1973 All-Africa Games
Olympic boxers of Nigeria
Boxers at the 1972 Summer Olympics
20th-century Nigerian people
21st-century Nigerian people
Medallists at the 1974 British Commonwealth Games